Gymnastics was contested at the 1986 Asian Games, held in Seoul, South Korea from September 21, 1986, to September 24, 1986. Only artistic events were contested.

Medalists

Men

Women

Medal table

References 

 New Straits Times, September 22–25, 1986
 Asian Games medalists

External links 
 Olympic Council of Asia

 
1986 Asian Games events
1986
Asian Games
1986 Asian Games